The 1979 World Judo Championships were the 10th edition of the Men's World Judo Championships, and were held in Paris, France from 6–9 December, 1979. The last tournament in 1977 had been cancelled.

Medal overview

Men

Medal table

External links
 

 videos found on de.video.search.yahoo.com retrieved December 10, 2013

W
J
World Judo Championships
World
J